Baltistan Division is a first-order administrative division of Pakistan's dependent territory of Gilgit-Baltistan, overlapping with the historic Baltistan.

The divisional headquarters of the Baltistan Division is the town of Skardu. Since divisions were restored in 2008, the Baltistan Division currently consists of five districts:

 Ghanche District
 Kharmang District
 Rondu District
 Shigar District
 Skardu District

Administration 
The Baltistan is one of three divisions of Gilgit Baltistan. The Division of Baltistan is administrative under a Commissioner of BPS-20 belonging to Pakistan Administrative Service group of Central Superior Services of Pakistan. The Current Commissioner Baltistan Division is Mr Shula Alam (PAS).

See also
 Skardu

References

Divisions of Pakistan